Germanium tetrachloride is a colourless, fuming liquid with a peculiar, acidic odour. It is used as an intermediate in the production of purified germanium metal. In recent years, GeCl4 usage has increased substantially due to its use as a reagent for fiber optic production.

Production
Most commercial production of germanium is from treating flue-dusts of zinc- and copper-ore smelters, although a significant source is also found in the ash from the combustion of certain types of coal called vitrain. Germanium tetrachloride is an intermediate for the purification of germanium metal or its oxide, GeO2.

Germanium tetrachloride can be generated directly from GeO2 (germanium dioxide) by dissolution of the oxide in concentrated hydrochloric acid. The resulting mixture is fractionally distilled to purify and separate the germanium tetrachloride from other products and impurities. The GeCl4 can be rehydrolysed with deionized water to produce pure GeO2, which is then reduced under hydrogen to produce germanium metal.

Production of GeO2, however, is dependent on the oxidized form of germanium extracted from the ore. Copper-lead-sulfide and zinc-sulfide ores will produce GeS2, which is subsequently oxidized to GeO2 with an oxidizer such as sodium chlorate. Zinc-ores are roasted and sintered and can produce the GeO2 directly. The oxide is then processed as discussed above.

The classic synthesis from chlorine and germanium metal at elevated temperatures is also possible. Additionally,  a chlorine free activation of germanium has been developed, giving a less energy intensive and more environmentally friendly alternative synthesis for germanium precursors.

Application
Germanium tetrachloride is used almost exclusively as an intermediate for several optical processes. GeCl4 can be directly hydrolysed to GeO2, an oxide glass with several unique properties and applications, described below and in linked articles:

Fiber optics
A notable derivative of GeCl4 is germanium dioxide.  In the manufacture of optical fibers, silicon tetrachloride, SiCl4, and germanium tetrachloride, GeCl4, are introduced with oxygen into a hollow glass preform, which is carefully heated to allow for oxidation of the reagents to their respective oxides and formation of a glass mixture. The GeO2 has a high index of refraction, so by varying the flow rate of germanium tetrachloride the overall index of refraction of the optical fiber can be specifically controlled. The GeO2 is about 4% by weight of the glass.

References

See also
 Germanium
 Optical fiber
 Infrared

Germanium(IV) compounds
Chlorides
Metal halides
Nonmetal halides